Skoronski is a surname. Notable people with the surname include:

Anthony Skoronski (1920–1992), American thoroughbred jockey
Bob Skoronski (1934–2018), American football player
Ed Skoronski (1910–1996), American football player

See also

Skowronski